Norris Lake is a lake in Anoka County, Minnesota, in the United States.

Norris Lake was named for Grafton Norris.

See also
List of lakes in Minnesota

References

Lakes of Minnesota
Lakes of Anoka County, Minnesota